Nonette may refer to:

 Nonette (river), a tributary of the Oise in northern France
 The Prix de la Nonette, a horse race held in Deauville, France each August
 Nonette, Puy-de-Dôme, a commune of the Puy-de-Dôme department in France
 The Nonnette is a French small gingerbread cake with orange marmalade.